Ty Wishart (born May 19, 1988) is a Canadian professional ice hockey defenceman. He is currently playing with the Melbourne Mustangs in the AIHL.

Wishart grew up in Comox, British Columbia, playing minor hockey there until his midget years.

Playing career
In the 2010–11 season, Wishart was with Lightning affiliate the Norfolk Admirals when on January 1, 2011, he was traded by the Tampa Bay Lightning to the New York Islanders for goaltender Dwayne Roloson. He was directly assigned to Islanders' AHL affiliate the  Sound Tigers, before he was later recalled to make his debut with the Islanders. Wishart scored his first NHL goal on February 13, 2011 against Ryan Miller of the Buffalo Sabres in a 7-6 overtime victory.

Prior to the 2013–14 season, Wishart left North America and signed a contract with Schwenninger Wild Wings of the German DEL on August 29, 2013.  While Wishart was expected play for the team during 2014-15 season, in August 2014 the Wild Wings terminated his contract at Wishart's request so he could return to North America for personal reasons.

After a stint with ECHL's Evansville Icemen in 2014–15, he moved to Sweden during the season to join Mora IK of the second-tier Allsvenskan league. On October 1, 2015, he inked a deal with German DEL2 club, Eispiraten Crimmitschau for the remainder of the 2015–16 season.

Entering his seventh season abroad, following tenures in Sweden, Slovakia, Czech Republic and Hungary, Wishart returned to former German club, Eispiraten Crimmitschau for the 2019–20 season.

Wishart is now a member of the Melbourne Mustangs in the AIHL, for season 2022.

Career statistics

Regular season and playoffs

International

Awards and honours

References

External links

1988 births
HC '05 Banská Bystrica players
Bridgeport Sound Tigers players
Canadian ice hockey defencemen
Canadian expatriate ice hockey players in Germany
ETC Crimmitschau players
HC Dynamo Pardubice players
Evansville IceMen players
Fehérvár AV19 players
Ice hockey people from British Columbia
Living people
Moose Jaw Warriors players
Mora IK players
National Hockey League first-round draft picks
New York Islanders players
Norfolk Admirals players
People from Comox, British Columbia
Prince George Cougars players
San Jose Sharks draft picks
Schwenninger Wild Wings players
Tampa Bay Lightning players
Worcester Sharks players
Canadian expatriate ice hockey players in the United States
Canadian expatriate ice hockey players in Sweden
Canadian expatriate ice hockey players in Slovakia
Canadian expatriate ice hockey players in the Czech Republic
Canadian expatriate ice hockey players in Poland
Canadian expatriate ice hockey players in Hungary
Canadian expatriate ice hockey players in Romania
Canadian expatriate ice hockey players in Australia